Bennett Hill is a feature on Earth's Moon, a mountain in the Hadley–Apennine region.  Astronauts David Scott and James Irwin landed the Lunar Module Falcon about 27 km east of it in 1971, on the Apollo 15 mission, but they did not visit it.  They could see it on the western horizon from nearly everywhere they went.  The peak rises approximately 900 meters above the surrounding plain, known as Palus Putredinis.

The astronauts named the feature after NASA trajectory designer Floyd Bennett.  The name is informal and not recognized by the IAU, but the name is used in the scientific literature, such as the Apollo 15 Preliminary Science Report.

See also
Hill 305 (lunar mountain)

External links
 LTO-41B4 Hadley, Lunar Topographic Orthophotomap 41B4

References

Mountains on the Moon